The El Salvador national under-23 football team represents El Salvador in international football competitions during Olympic Games and Pan American Games. The team is controlled by the Salvadoran Football Federation. The selection is limited to players under the age of 23, except for three overage players.

Olympic history

At the 1968 CONCACAF Men's Pre-Olympic Tournament, El Salvador passed the first round with an aggregated score of 5–1 against Cuba. For the final round, the national team finished  with an aggregate score of 4–1 against Trinidad and Tobago, three of them were scored by Juan Ramón Martínez.

In the 1972 CONCACAF Men's Pre-Olympic Tournament, El Salvador came close to clinching qualification for their second appearance at the Olympic Games. In the first round, the national team got an aggregate score of 2–2 against the United States and an aggregate score of 7–2 against Barbados. The group was tied between El Salvador and the United States, so they had to play in a neutral setting. In regulatory time, the two teams were tied at 0–0. At the end of extra time, the game was tied 1–1 with a goal from Victor Manuel Valencia (112'). The United States advanced after a crucial victory of 6–5 in a penalty shootout. The team was coached by Conrado Miranda.                                 

At the 1976 CONCACAF Men's Pre-Olympic Tournament, El Salvador, at home, surpassed with an aggregate score of 6–1 the preliminary round. In the first round of series B, El Salvador lost with an aggregate score of 1–3 with only goal from Luis Ramírez Zapata.

In the 1980 CONCACAF Men's Pre-Olympic Tournament, El Salvador lost in an aggregate score of 1–2 (0–2,1–0) against Guatemala. The only goal was scored by Alex Cordero. Coached by Raúl Magaña, they did not participate for that Olympics.

In the 1984 CONCACAF Men's Pre-Olympic Tournament, El Salvador lost in an aggregate score of 0–6 (0–2,0–4) against Guatemala. Coached by Contreras Palma, they did not participate for that Olympics.                                  

In the 1988 CONCACAF Men's Pre-Olympic Tournament, El Salvador won in an aggregate score of 4–3 (1–1,3–2) against Panama. They did not participate for that Olympics.

The El Salvador U-23 national football team has failed to qualify for the Olympic Games since it became a specifically under-23 competition during the 1992 Summer Olympics in Barcelona, Spain.   

Previously El Salvador had only once participated at the Olympic Games. They achieved this in their first attempt in 1967 when they qualified to the 1968 Summer Olympics. This qualification was achieved after defeating both Cuba and Trinidad & Tobago in the qualifiers.

Competitive record

Olympic Games

CONCACAF Men's Olympic Qualifying Tournament

Pan American Games

Schedule and results

2021

Players

Current squad
The following 20 players were called up for the 2020 CONCACAF Men's Olympic Qualifying Championship.

Recent call-ups
The following were a part of the provisional 2020 Olympic Qualifying Championship announced on 23 February 2021.

Coaching staff

Coaches
  Rigoberto Guzmán (1967–1968)
  Conrado Miranda (1971–1972)
  Marcelo Estrada and Rigoberto Guzmán (1976)
  Raul Magana (1979)
  Contreras Palma (1983)
  Raul Magana and  Milovan Đorić (1987-1988)
  Óscar Benítez (1991)
  Víctor Manuel Pacheco (1995–1996)
  Juan Ramon Paredes (2003)
  Carlos de los Cobos (2007)
  Mauricio Alfaro (2011–2012)
  Juan Ramón Sánchez (2015)
  Rodolfo Góchez (2019–2020)
  Hugo Pérez (2021–present)

Record versus other nations
''Records for competitive matches only from 1991. As of 03-31-12

Honours
CONCACAF Olympic Qualifying Championship
Third place (1): 2012

See also
El Salvador national football team
El Salvador national under-21 football team
El Salvador national under-20 football team
El Salvador national under-17 football team
Federación Salvadoreña de Fútbol

References 

under-23
Central American national under-23 association football teams